Anders Bror Eka (born 6 September 1961) is a Swedish lawyer. Since 2013, he is a Justice of the Supreme Court. In 2018, he was appointed President of the Supreme Court.

Anders Eka graduated in law at Uppsala University in 1987 and did service as a law clerk at District Court in 1987–1990. He became a Legal Clerk at Svea Court of Appeal in 1991 and was appointed Associate Judge in 1995. In 1995–1997, Anders Eka worked as a Legal Adviser at the Ministry of Justice and was then Administrative Director in Svea Court of Appeal from 1997 to 2000. Appointed Judge of Appeal at Svea Court of Appeal in 2000, he was an Administrative Director at the Chancellor of Justice's Office in 2000–2003. Anders Eka was appointed Senior Judge in Stockholm District Court in 2003. In 2004–2008, he worked as Administrative Director and Chief Secreraty to the Working Committee on Constitutional Reform. Eka was appointed Senior Judge of Appeal and Head of Division in Svea Court of Appeal in 2009 and Chief Judge in Stockholm District Court in 2010. In 2013, the Government appointed him Justice of the Supreme Court (Swedish: justitieråd). In 2018, he was appointed Chairman of the Supreme Court. He took office on 1 September 2018.

References 

1961 births
Living people
Uppsala University alumni
Presidents of the Supreme Court of Sweden
21st-century Swedish judges